The Tianjin Tower, or Jin Tower, or Tianjin World Financial Center is a modern supertall skyscraper located in the Heping District of Tianjin, China, on the banks of the Hai River. The area of the glass unitized curtain wall, manufactured by Jangho Group, is 215,000m². It is notable as the first office building in Tianjin to be equipped with double decker elevators.

The skyscraper was topped-out on January 14, 2010 and opened in 2011.

The building is owned by Financial Street Holding, with JLL (company) as joint sales and leasing agents.

History

References

External links

 Tianjin Global Financial Center on CTBUH Skyscraper Center

Skyscraper office buildings in Tianjin
World Financial Centers
Office buildings completed in 2010
2010 establishments in China
Skidmore, Owings & Merrill buildings